Rosalie Chiang (born October 1, 2005) is an American actress, model and author. She is best known as playing the starring role of Meilin Lee in the 2022 Pixar film Turning Red.

Early life
Chiang was born on October 1,
2005, in Fremont, California. Her mother is Taiwanese, while her father is Singaporean. Chiang is fluent in the Mandarin Chinese language. Her mother called her Mei-Mei as a child.

Career
Before entering acting, Chiang was an author and wrote two poetry books A is for Albatross: Birds A to Z and A is for Arowana: Freshwater Fish A to Z. The former received the Skipping Stones Honour Award. Chiang had previously played minor roles in short films and commercials prior to being hired as the lead role in Turning Red. She auditioned for the role using her mother's iPhone 6. During the film's development, Chiang was hired at the age of 12 as a temporary placeholder until the team could hire another voice actress for the character. As the film continued with development, Chiang was hired as a permanent cast member for the film.

Filmography

Television

Film

References

External links 

 
 
 

2005 births
Living people
21st-century American actresses
Actresses from California
American film actresses
American people of Chinese descent
American people of Singaporean descent
American people of Taiwanese descent
American voice actresses
People from Fremont, California